Ovçubərə (or Ovçudərə, known as Kulibinka until 1998) is a village and municipality in the Bilasuvar Rayon of Azerbaijan. It has a population of 1,595.

References

Populated places in Bilasuvar District